The following is a list of notable deaths in December 1992.

Entries for each day are listed alphabetically by surname. A typical entry lists information in the following sequence:
 Name, age, country of citizenship at birth, subsequent country of citizenship (if applicable), reason for notability, cause of death (if known), and reference.

December 1992

1
Don Allum, 55, British oarsman, first person to row across the Atlantic Ocean in both directions, heart attack.
Magne Bleness, 59, Norwegian actor and theatre director.
Chile Gómez, 83, Mexican-American Major League Baseball player.
Floyd Hicks, 77, American politician and attorney.
Anton Malatinský, 72, Slovak football player.
Paulo Rónai, 85, Hungarian-Brazilian translator, philologist, and critic.
D. G. M. Wood-Gush, 70, South African ethologist.

2
Jack Caffery, 58, Canadian ice hockey player.
Jaime de la Rosa, 71, Filipino actor.
Michael Gothard, 53, English actor (For Your Eyes Only, The Three Musketeers, Arthur of the Britons), suicide by hanging.
Pete Gross, 55, American sports announcer, cancer.
Ralph Izzard, 82, English journalist, author, and adventurer.
Mikhail Karyukov, 87, Soviet film director, cinematographer and screenwriter.
Frank D. O'Connor, 82, American lawyer and politician.

3
Nureddin al-Atassi, 63, Syrian politician, president (1966–1970).
Luis Alcoriza, 74, Mexican screenwriter and film director.
Prayoon Chanyavongs, 77, Thai comics artist and cartoonist.
Andrei Sepsi, 81, Romanian football player.
Bill Ward, 71, American football player.

4
Henry Clausen, 87, American lawyer and investigator.
Yancho Dimitrov, 49, Bulgarian footballer.
Alfie Ferguson, 65, British unionist politician.
Sidney Schofield, 81, British politician.

5
Felipe Padilla de Leon, 80, Filipino composer.
Emil Haury, 88, American archaeologist.
Levan Maruashvili, 80, Georgian geographer and alpinist.
Monisha, 21, Indian actress, traffic collision.
Rakesh Singh, 22, Indian Army officer and war hero, killed in action.
Hilary Tindall, 54, English actress, bowel cancer.
Frank I. Wright, 71, American thoroughbred horse racing trainer and commentator.

6
Paula Frías Allende, 29, Chilean humanitarian, complications from a medical error.
J. Michel Fournier, 87, Canadian politician.
Percy Herbert, 72, English actor (The Bridge on the River Kwai, The Guns of Navarone, Cimarron Strip), heart attack.
Heorhii Maiboroda, 79, Ukrainian composer.
Yngve Sköld, 93, Swedish composer.
László Szabó, 84, Hungarian Olympic rower (1936).
Hank Worden, 91, American actor (The Searchers, The Alamo, The Lone Ranger).

7
Zoltán Adamik, 64, Hungarian sprinter and Olympian.
Alojzy Ehrlich, 77-78, Polish table tennis player.
Richard Joseph Hughes, 83, American politician, and judge.
Felix Jackson, 90, German-American screenwriter.
Bill Shockley, 55, American gridiron football player.
Chancellor Williams, 98, American sociologist, historian and writer.

8
Thoppil Bhasi, 68, Indian playwright, screenwriter, and film director.
Hugh Devore, 82, American football player.
Armanda Guiducci, 69, Italian writer, literary critic, and Marxist feminist.
Kathy Osterman, 49, American politician, cancer.
Frithjof Prydz, 49, Norwegian ski jumper, tennis player and Olympian.
Poola Tirupati Raju, 88, Indian writer, philosopher, and academic.
William Shawn, 85, American magazine editor (The New Yorker).

9
Carl Barger, 62, American baseball executive, aortic aneurysm.
Eşref Bilgiç, 84, Turkish international football player and manager.
Thomas Bottomore, 72, British marxist sociologist.
Joe Clark, 95, Australian politician.
Geoffroy Chodron de Courcel, 80, French diplomat.
Franco Franchi, 64, Italian actor, comedian and singer.
George Fraser, 81, Canadian football player.
Vincent Gardenia, 72, Italian-American actor (Bang the Drum Slowly, Little Shop of Horrors, Death Wish), Emmy winner (1990), heart attack.
Yahya Haqqi, 87, Egyptian novelist.
Luisito Rey, 47, Spanish singer, pneumonia.

10
Celia Gámez, 87, Argentinian film actress, Alzheimer's disease.
Joan Gardner, 66, American voice actress, cancer
Dan Maskell, 84, English tennis player and sportscaster, heart failure.
Josephine McKim, 82, American swimmer, Olympic champion and world record-holder.
John G. A. O'Neil, 55, American politician, traffic collision.
Jacques Perret, 91, French writer.
Babe Phelps, 84, American baseball player.
Bernard Reichel, 91, Swiss composer.

11
Billy Cook, 83, Northern Irish football player and manager.
William Michael Cosgrove, 76, American prelate of the Roman Catholic Church.
Lon Evans, 80, American gridiron football player.
Ronald Good, 96, British botanist.
Andy Kirk, 94, American jazz saxophonist, tubist, and band leader, Alzheimer's disease.
Suzanne Lilar, 91, Belgian novelist and playwright.
William A. Redmond, 84, American politician.
Michael Robbins, 62, English actor, prostate cancer.

12
Ali Amini, 87, Iranian politician, prime minister (1961–1962).
Malachy Carey, 36, Northern Irish IRA volunteer, assassinated.
Bernard Lievegoed, 87, Dutch psychiatrist.
Jasu Patel, 68, Indian cricket player.
Robert Rex, 83, Niuean politician, premier (since 1974).
Rube Walker, 66, American baseball player, lung cancer.

13
Ellis Arnall, 85, American politician.
Jens Bolling, 77, Norwegian actor and theatre director.
Oscar Britt, 73, American gridiron football player.
Mono Mohan Das, 82, Indian politician.
K. C. Irving, 93, Canadian businessman.
Luther Jeralds, 54, American football player.
Miskow Makwarth, 87, Danish actor.
Aleksandar Tirnanić, 82, Yugoslav football player and manager.
Cornelius Vanderbilt Whitney, 93, American businessman, film producer, and philanthropist.

14
Watazumi Doso, 81, Japanese bamboo flutist.
Kingo Machimura, 92, Japanese politician.
William H. Oldendorf, 67, American neurologist, physician, and researcher.
Severino Rigoni, 78, Italian cyclist and Olympic silver medalist.

15
Sven Delblanc, 61, Swedish author and academic, cancer.
Marcel Lachmann, 84, French Olympic field hockey player (1928, 1936).
Yolande Laffon, 97, French actress.
Otto Lington, 89, Danish composer, bandleader and violinist.
Ennio Morlotti, 82, Italian painter.
Jim Musick, 82, American gridiron football player.
Hermann Stövesand, 86, German actor.
William Ware Theiss, 61, American costume designer (Star Trek, Harold and Maude, Bound for Glory), AIDS.

16
Erica Brausen, 84, British art dealer and gallerist.
Monk Dorsett, 83, College football and basketball player.
Adil Guliyev, 70, Soviet-Azerbaijani fighter pilot and flying ace during World War II.
Erik Johansson, 65, Swedish ice hockey player and Olympic medalist.
Anton Koolhaas, 80, Dutch journalist and writer.
Gonzalo Rodríguez Martín-Granizo, 64, Spanish Navy admiral general.

17
Serafima Amosova, 78, Soviet bomber commander during World War II.
Günther Anders, 90, German philosopher.
Dana Andrews, 83, American actor, congestive heart failure.
George N. Craig, 83, American politician, Governor of Indiana (1953–1957).
Andrew Jacobs, 86, American politician, member of the U.S. House of Representatives (1949–1951).
William Knecht, 62, American competition rower and Olympic champion.
Rinus Terlouw, 70, Dutch footballer, Alzheimer's disease.
Suren Yeremyan, 84, Soviet and Armenian historian and cartographer.

18
Antonio Amurri, 67, Italian author, radio and television writer and lyricist.
Vojin Bakić, 77, Yugoslav sculptor.
Per Brandtmar, 74, Danish football player.
Howard Cann, 97, American basketball player and coach.
Mark Goodson, 77, American game show producer (The Price Is Right, I've Got a Secret, What's My Line?), pancreatic cancer.
Clara Hale, 87, American humanitarian, complications from a stroke.
Vladimir Semyonovich Semyonov, 81, Soviet diplomat, pneumonia.

19
Gianni Brera, 73, Italian journalist and novelist, traffic collision.
Abraham Charnes, 75, American mathematician and economist.
Louis Ducreux, 81, French actor, screenwriter and composer.
Vladimir Grebennikov, 60, Soviet ice hockey player and Olympic medalist.
H. L. A. Hart, 85, English legal philosopher.
Rosel H. Hyde, 92, American lawyer.
Reggie Ingle, 89, English cricketer.

20
A. Hamid Arief, 68, Indonesian actor.
Peter Brocco, 89, American actor (Spartacus, One Flew Over the Cuckoo's Nest, Our Man Flint), heart attack.
Bernard Dubourg, 47, French poet.
Luciano Dal Falco, 67, Italian politician.
Harald Huffmann, 84, German field hockey player and Olympic medalist.
Steve Ross, 65, American media executive, prostate cancer.
Walter Zadek, 92, German-Israeli photographer.

21
Stella Adler, 91, American actress and acting teacher, heart failure.
Sybil Andrews, 94, English-Canadian artist.
Philip Farkas, 78, American classical musician.
David Hare, 75, American surrealist artist, aortic aneurysm.
Albert King, 69, American blues guitarist and singer, heart attack.
Nathan Milstein, 88, Ukrainian-American violinist, heart attack.
Alex Quaison-Sackey, 68, Ghanaian diplomat.

22
Bolaji Badejo, 39, Nigerian visual artist and actor (Alien), sickle-cell disease.
Charles B. Black, 71, American basketball player.
Harry Bluestone, 85, American violinist, tuberculosis.
Rajendran Christie, 54, Indian field hockey player and Olympic medalist.
Brian Doyle, 62, English football player.
Frederick William Franz, 99, American Jehovah's Witness leader.
William Janney, 84, American actor.
Erik Lindén, 81, Swedish freestyle wrestler and Olympic medalist.
Milo Sperber, 81, British actor, director and writer.
Cornelio Villareal, 88, Filipino politician.
Ted Willis, Baron Willis, 78, English screenwriter and playwright.

23
Jadwiga Chojnacka, 87, Polish film actress.
Lona Cohen, 79, American spy for the Soviet Union.
Vincent Fourcade, 58, French interior designer, AIDS-related complications.
Eddie Hazel, 42, American funk guitarist and singer, liver failure.
Frank Hekma, 81, American Olympic sailor (1928).
Vyacheslav Kurennoy, 60, Russian Olympic water polo player (1956, 1960).
Robert Marshak, 76, American physicist and educator.
Hank Mizell, 69, American rockabilly singer, guitarist, and songwriter.
Italo Pedroncelli, 57, Italian Olympic alpine skier (1956, 1960, 1964).
Cyril Walters, 87, Welsh cricketer.

24
Bobby LaKind, 47, American conga musician, colon cancer.
Micheline Luccioni, 62, French actress.
Jack Nichols, 66, American basketball player.
Peyo, 64, Belgian comic artist and writer (The Smurfs), heart attack.
Adela Sequeyro, 91, Mexican actress and journalist.
Stella Skopal, 88, Croatian sculptor.
William Trueheart, 74, American diplomat.

25
Giuseppe Bonomi, 80, Italian football player coach.
Ted Croker, 68, English footballer.
Garrison H. Davidson, 88, American lieutenant general.
Monica Dickens, 77, English author.
Ed Donnelly, 60, American baseball player.
Sandra Dorne, 68, British actress.
Richard Howard Ichord, Jr., 66, American politician, member of the U.S. House of Representatives (1961–1981).
Helen Joseph, 87, South African anti-apartheid activist.

26
Constance Carpenter, 88, English actress, stroke.
Jack Crayston, 82, English football player and manager.
Dancer's Image, 27, American thoroughbred racehorse.
Edmund Davies, Baron Edmund-Davies, 86, British judge.
Jan Flinterman, 73, Dutch racing driver.
Tom Gorman, 67, American baseball player.
Edward Howard-Vyse, 87, British Army officer, horse rider and Olympic medalist.
Anthony Huxley, 72, British botanist.
John George Kemeny, 66, Hungarian-American mathematician and computer scientist, heart failure.
Nikita Magaloff, 80, Georgian-Russian pianist.
Eve Poole, 67, New Zealand politician.
María Bruguera Pérez, 79, Spanish anarcho-syndicalist.
Hilde Wagener, 88, German-Austrian actress.

27
Stephen Albert, 51, American composer, traffic collision.
Dhananjay Bhattacharya, 70, Indian Bengali singer and composer.
Kay Boyle, 90, American novelist.
Alfred H. Clifford, 84, American mathematician.
James Patterson Lyke, 53, American Roman Catholic prelate, cancer.

28
Jack Delinger, 66, American bodybuilder, heart attack.
Vicente Gerbasi, 79, Venezuelan poet and writer.
Nils Handal, 86, Norwegian politician.
Sal Maglie, 75, American baseball player, pneumonia.
Elfie Mayerhofer, 75, Austrian actress and singer.
William G. McLoughlin, 70, American historian.
Aimé Michel, 73, French science and spirituality writer and author.
Milutin Pajević, 72, Montenegrin football player and manager.
Daniella Perez, 22, Brazilian actress and dancer, murdered.
Otto Lara Resende, 70, Brazilian journalist.
Cardew Robinson, 75, English comedian, ischemic colitis.
Vicente Rondón, 54, Venezuelan boxer.
Chang Woon-soo, 64, South Korean football player and manager.
Doug Wright, 75, English football player.

29
Jaroslav Borovička, 61, Czech football player.
Yahya Kanu, Sierra Leone military officer, president.
James Napoli, 81, American mobster belonging to the Genovese crime family.
Vivienne Segal, 95, American actress and singer, heart failure.
Fidel Tricánico, 77, Uruguayan boxer and Olympian.

30
Phil H. Bucklew, 78, American gridiron football player.
Dorothy Chacko, 88, American social worker, humanitarian and medical doctor.
César Domela, 92, Dutch sculptor, painter, photographer, and typographer.
Timothy S. Healy, 69, American Roman Catholic priest and academic, heart attack.
Mihailo Lalić, 78, Montenegrin-Serbian writer.
Romeo Muller, 64, American screenwriter and actor, heart attack.
Chloethiel Woodard Smith, 82, American architect, cancer.
Lusine Zakaryan, 55, Armenian singer, diabetes.

31
Denis Barnett, 86, British RAF air marshal during World War II.
Elene Gokieli, 74, Soviet-Georgian hurdler, sprinter and Olympian.
Dianne Jackson, 51, English animation director (The Snowman), cancer.
Cyril Peacock, 63, British racing cyclist and Olympian.
Bill Spears, 86, American football player.
Kristján Vattnes, 76, Icelandic Olympic javelin thrower (1936).

References 

1992-12
 12